Empis pennipes is a species of dance flies, in the fly family Empididae. It is included in the subgenus Empis. It is found in most of Europe, except the Balkan Peninsula and the Iberian Peninsula.

References

External links
Fauna Europaea

Empis
Asilomorph flies of Europe
Flies described in 1758
Taxa named by Carl Linnaeus